Michael Faragalli (born 1958) is a football coach at Ave Maria University, coaching tight ends, as well as being the offensive coordinator. He is the former running backs coach at the University of Virginia, and was the offensive coordinator and quarterbacks coach at the University of Richmond. He is also a former head coach of the Toronto Argonauts.

Faragalli played defensive back at the University of Rhode Island from 1975 to 1978.  He began his coaching career as a graduate assistant and later wide receivers coach at the Rhode Island in 1979. He held the same position as receiver's coach the University of Wisconsin–Madison and at the College of William & Mary.

In 1985, he was hired by the Hamilton Tiger-Cats to serve as Al Bruno's offensive coordinator at the age of 26, losing the Grey Cup in his first season and winning it the following season. In 1987, he moved to the Montreal Alouettes to serve as offensive coordinator under his father, Joe, however the team folded before the season began. In 1988 Faragalli rejoined his dad, now coach of the Edmonton Eskimos as offensive coordinator. In his three seasons in Edmonton the team advanced to the Western Conference title game each season and lead the Eskimos to a 50–11 Grey Cup loss in 1990. He also helped develop quarterback Tracy Ham, who was the CFL Most Outstanding Player in 1989.

From 1991 to 1994 and 1996 to 1999, Faragalli guided the offensive attack at Bowling Green State University. The Falcons led the Mid-American Conference in scoring offense in four of his eight seasons and ranked 13th in the nation in rushing offense in the 1998. He helped lead the team to two bowl championships, the California Raisin Bowl in 1991 and the Las Vegas Bowl in 1992.

In 1995 Faragalli was hired to coach the Toronto Argonauts. His contract was terminated by GM Bob O'Billovich, in order for O'Billovich to again take control of the head coach position. This was in part due to the Argonauts being on the verge of folding. At season's end, Faragalli returned to Bowling Green for the latter of his two stints as offensive coordinator.

In 2000 Faragalli was hired by Lafayette as offensive coordinator and quarterbacks coach. Faragalli's passing offense has ranked either first or second in the Patriot League in five of his first six seasons.

On February 5, 2008 Faragalli was named offensive coordinator and quarterbacks coach for the Richmond Spiders football team. The Spiders went 13–3 during the 2008 season, which set a record for the most won games in a season. Richmond went on to the playoffs and then to the Division I National Championship game on December 19, 2008 in Chattanooga, Tennessee. They beat the Montana Grizzlies 24-7, winning Richmond's first National Championship in any sport.

On December 6, 2009 Faragalli and the Richmond Spiders ended their season with a quarterfinals loss to Appalachian State, 34–31. The Spiders had a record season posting an 11–1 regular season record, while adding a 12th victory in the opening round of the playoffs.

Head coaching record

References

External links
 Lafayette profile
 Virginia profile
 Norfolk State profile

1958 births
Living people
American football defensive backs
Bowling Green Falcons football coaches
Christopher Newport Captains football coaches
Columbia Lions football coaches
Edmonton Elks coaches
Hamilton Tiger-Cats coaches
Lafayette Leopards football coaches
Montreal Alouettes coaches
Norfolk State Spartans football coaches
Rhode Island Rams football coaches
Rhode Island Rams football players
Richmond Spiders football coaches
Toronto Argonauts coaches
Virginia Cavaliers football coaches
William & Mary Tribe football coaches
Wisconsin Badgers football coaches
Sportspeople from Philadelphia
Players of American football from Philadelphia